

Ernst Haccius (11 December 1893 – 11 February 1943) was a German officer in the Wehrmacht of Nazi Germany during World War II who commanded the 46th Infantry Division. He was a recipient of the Knight's Cross of the Iron Cross. Haccius was killed 11 February 1943 north of Krasnodar /Caucasus; he was posthumously promoted to the rank of Generalleutnant and awarded the Knight's Cross.

Awards and decorations

 Knight's Cross of the Iron Cross on 2 April 1943 as Generalleutnant and commander of 46. Infanterie-Division

References

Citations

Bibliography

 

1893 births
1943 deaths
Military personnel from Hanover
People from the Province of Hanover
Lieutenant generals of the German Army (Wehrmacht)
German Army personnel of World War I
Recipients of the clasp to the Iron Cross, 1st class
Recipients of the Gold German Cross
Recipients of the Knight's Cross of the Iron Cross
German Army personnel killed in World War II
German Army generals of World War II